

This is a list of the National Register of Historic Places listings in Butler County, Kansas.

This is intended to be a complete list of the properties on the National Register of Historic Places in Butler County, Kansas, United States. The locations of National Register properties for which the latitude and longitude coordinates are included below, may be seen in a map.

There are 27 properties listed on the National Register in the county.

Current listings

|}

See also

 List of National Historic Landmarks in Kansas
 National Register of Historic Places listings in Kansas

References

Butler
Buildings and structures in Butler County, Kansas